Comstock Independent School District is a public school district based in the community of Comstock, Texas, United States.  The district consists of a single K-12 school located in Comstock. 

In addition to Comstock, the district also serves the census designated places of Amistad and Box Canyon, as well as the unincorporated areas of Juno, Langtry, and Pandale.

In 2007, the Texas State Energy Conservation Office awards Comstock ISD money due to the colonias served by the district.

In 2009, the school district was rated "recognized" by the Texas Education Agency.

History

Prior to 1976 Comstock ISD absorbed the Langtry Common School District and the Pandale Common School District.

On July 1, 1992, the Juno Common School District merged into Comstock ISD.

References

External links

School districts in Val Verde County, Texas
1910 establishments in Texas
School districts established in 1910